Kryvyi Rih-Main is a railway station in Ukraine, the main passenger station of the Cisdnieper Railways. It is located in Kryvyi Rih, the seventh most populous city of Ukraine.

Rail transport in Kryvyi Rih
Buildings and structures in Kryvyi Rih
Ukrainian Railways railway stations
Railway stations in Kryvyi Rih
Transportation infrastructure in Kryvyi Rih